Brindle is a coat coloring pattern in animals.

Brindle may also refer to:

 Brindle (surname), people with the name
 Brindle, Lancashire, small village in England
 Treeing Tennessee Brindle, breed of dog
 Brindle Cliffs, Antarctic Apennines, Antarctica